Tayron Luis Guerrero (born January 9, 1991) is a Colombian professional baseball pitcher in the Cincinnati Reds organization. He has played in Major League Baseball (MLB) for the San Diego Padres and the Miami Marlins and in Nippon Professional Baseball for the Chiba Lotte Marines. Guerrero has also played for the Colombian national baseball team at the World Baseball Classic.

Career

San Diego Padres
The Padres signed Guerrero as an amateur free agent in 2009. In 2014, Guerrero started the season with the Fort Wayne TinCaps of the Class A Midwest League before receiving a promotion to the Lake Elsinore Storm of the Class A-Advanced California League. Guerrero played in the 2014 All-Star Futures Game for the World Team, recording a strikeout of Peter O'Brien. After the season, the Padres assigned Guerrero to the Arizona Fall League to continue his development. He was added to the 40-man roster on November 20, 2014.

Guerrero was called up to the major leagues on May 15, 2016, and made his major league debut on May 17.

Miami Marlins
On July 29, 2016, the Padres traded Guerrero, Andrew Cashner, Colin Rea, and cash considerations to the Miami Marlins in exchange for Josh Naylor, Jarred Cosart, Carter Capps, and Luis Castillo. After the trade, he pitched for the Jacksonville Jumbo Shrimp of the Class AA Southern League, for whom he had a 0–1 win–loss record with a 3.38 earned run average (ERA), and 22 strikeouts in 16 innings pitched. Guerrero competed for the Colombian national baseball team in the 2017 World Baseball Classic. In 2018 with Miami he was 1–3 with a 5.43 ERA, and 68 strikeouts in 58 innings, averaging 10.6 strikeouts per 9 innings. His fastest pitch of 2018 was 104.0 miles an hour, third-best in MLB only to pitches by Jordan Hicks and Aroldis Chapman.

Guerrero was designated for assignment on December 2, 2019.

Chicago White Sox
On December 6, 2019, Guerrero was claimed off waivers by the Chicago White Sox from the Marlins. Guerrero was designated for assignment on January 2, 2020, following the promotion of Luis Robert. Guerrero did not play in a game in 2020 due to the cancellation of the minor league season because of the COVID-19 pandemic. Guerrero appeared in 18 games for the Triple-A Charlotte Knights in 2021, but struggled to a 6.63 ERA before being released on July 31, 2021.

Chiba Lotte Marines
On December 18, 2021, Guerrero signed with the Chiba Lotte Marines of Nippon Professional Baseball (NPB). In 2022, Guerrero appeared in 49 games for Lotte, recording a 3-3 record and 3.52 ERA with 63 strikeouts in 46.0 innings pitched.

Cincinnati Reds
On January 7, 2023, Guerrero signed a minor league deal with the Cincinnati Reds organization.

References

External links

1991 births
Living people
Águilas del Zulia players
Arizona League Padres players
Charlotte Knights players
Colombian expatriate baseball players in the United States
Dominican Summer League Padres players
Colombian expatriate baseball players in the Dominican Republic
El Paso Chihuahuas players
Eugene Emeralds players
Fort Wayne TinCaps players
Jacksonville Jumbo Shrimp players
Jacksonville Suns players
Jupiter Hammerheads players
Lake Elsinore Storm players
Major League Baseball pitchers
Major League Baseball players from Colombia
Miami Marlins players
New Orleans Baby Cakes players
People from Casanare Department
San Antonio Missions players
San Diego Padres players
Surprise Saguaros players
Tigres de Aragua players
Colombian expatriate baseball players in Venezuela
2017 World Baseball Classic players
Chiba Lotte Marines players
Nippon Professional Baseball pitchers